Shikast is a 1953 Hindi drama film produced and directed by Ramesh Saigal. The film stars Dilip Kumar, Nalini Jaywant, Durga Khote, Om Prakash and K. N. Singh. The film's music is by Shankar–Jaikishan. Wajahat Mirza wrote the story and dialogues for this film. The movie is loosely based on the Bengali movie Palli Samaj.

Plot 
After a seven-year absence, Dr. Ram Singh returns to his village intending to sell his land and go back to the city. He finds that the peasants are being mistreated by the local landlord and the landlord's sister, Sushma. The doctor and Sushma were once in love, but in his absence she has become an embittered widow. Unwilling to see the peasants suffer further, Ram decides not to sell and opens a school and a hospital instead. When the plague breaks out, the doctor saves Sushma's son and the flames of love are rekindled. However, social mores prevent any opening of hearts and (unable to express her feelings in any other way) Sushma resorts to further acts of cruelty in order to prevent Ram from leaving. Meanwhile, her brother stirs up hostility against the pair by spreading malicious rumours which excite the superstitious villagers, leading to a trial and a watery climax.

Cast 
Dilip Kumar as Dr. Ram Singh
Nalini Jaywant as Sushma
Durga Khote as Mrs. Singh
K. N. Singh as Madhav Singh
Om Prakash as Dheeru

Soundtrack 
Lyrics written by Shailendra and Hasrat Jaipuri.

References

External links 
 
 Full movie on YouTube, also 

1953 films
1950s Hindi-language films
Films scored by Shankar–Jaikishan
Hindi remakes of Bengali films
Indian drama films
1953 drama films
Indian black-and-white films
Films directed by Ramesh Saigal